The Electoral district of Wimmera was one of the original sixteen electoral districts of the old unicameral Victorian Legislative Council of 1851 to 1856. Victoria was a colony in Australia at the time.

The district was located in the far north-west of Victoria, its area was defined as being "Bounded on the east by the Avoca River to Lake Bael Bael and thence by a line due north to the River Murray on the north by the River Murray to the South Australian frontier on the west by the South Australian frontier and on the south by the Counties of Follett, Dundas and Ripon".

From 1856 onwards, the Victorian parliament consisted of two houses, the Victorian Legislative Council (upper house, consisting of Provinces) and the Victorian Legislative Assembly (lower house).

Members

 = resigned
 = by-election

Taylor later represented Southern Province in the Victorian Legislative Council from April 1864.

See also
 Parliaments of the Australian states and territories
 List of members of the Victorian Legislative Council

References

Former electoral districts of Victorian Legislative Council
1851 establishments in Australia
1856 disestablishments in Australia